This is a list of seasons played by Real Betis in Spanish and European football, from 1907 to the most recent completed season.

Key

Key to league record:
 Pos = Final position
 Pld = Matches played
 W = Matches won
 D = Matches drawn
 L = Matches lost
 GF = Goals for
 GA = Goals against
 Pts = Points

Key to rounds:
 W = Winners
 F = Final (Runners-up)
 SF = Semi-finals
 QF = Quarter-finals
 R16 = Round of 16
 R32 = Round of 32
 R64 = Round of 64

 R5 = Fifth round
 R4 = Fourth round
 R3 = Third round
 R2 = Second round
 R1 = First round
 GS = Group stage

Seasons

References

External links
 RSSSF.com

 
Real Betis